Clarence is a 1990 made-for-television film directed by Eric Till.
It is a sequel to the 1946 film It's a Wonderful Life following the character of Clarence Odbody from that film.

Plot
The film is set in December 1989. The only continuing character from the original film is the guardian angel, Clarence, played here by Robert Carradine. The plot is very similar to that of the 1946 film, with Kate Trotter playing  Rachel Logan, the human who needs Clarence's assistance.

Cast

Release
The film was made for TV and did not have a theatrical release. It was first broadcast on The Family Channel on November 24, 1990.

See also
 List of Christmas films
 List of films about angels

References

External links
 

1990 television films
1990 films
Canadian comedy television films
Canadian Christmas films
Canadian sequel films
Christmas television films
English-language Canadian films
Films directed by Eric Till
Television sequel films
Films about angels
1990s Canadian films